Jack Fish may refer to:
Jack Fish (American football), American football coach
Jack Fish (rugby league), English rugby league footballer

See also
Jackfish Lake (disambiguation)
John Fish (disambiguation)